The Karen Harvey Prize is awarded by the American Astronomical Society's Solar Physics Division in recognition for a significant contribution to the study of the Sun early in a person's professional career.

Past winners are:

2003 Dana Longcope
2004 Harry Warren
2005 Sarah E. Gibson
2006 Steven R Cranmer
2007 Jiong Qiu
2008 Mark G. Linton
2009 Laurent Gizon
2010 Brian Welsch
2011 Mathias Rempel
2012 Dibyendu Nandi
2013 Tibor Torok
2014 Alexis Rouillard
2015 Jonathan Cirtain
2016 Katharine Reeves
2017 Mark Cheung
2018 Nicholeen Viall
2019 Anthony Yeates
2020 Hui Tian
2021 Lucia Kleint
2022 Adam Kowalski
2023 Bin Chen

See also

 List of astronomy awards

References

External links
 

Astronomy prizes
American Astronomical Society